Châtillon-sur-Indre (literally Châtillon on Indre) is a commune in the Indre department, central France.

Population

See also
Communes of the Indre department

References

Communes of Indre
Touraine
Bituriges Cubi